"On My Mind" is a song by American DJ and record producer Diplo and EDM duo Sidepiece. It was released on December 13, 2019, via Higher Ground Records. The song was taken from "Steelo" (1996) by R&B group 702.

Composition
The song is written in the key of G major, with a tempo of 123 beats per minute.

Music video
On April 23, 2020. A video called "Do You Dance?" was released. According to the statement by Farrell Sweeney of Dancing Astronaut, the video is created with a new app Sway, and uses "AI-powered motion filters." It shows "a variety of people meeting and breaking out into intense dance." Subsequently the visual effect changes, dancers "beginning to punch and kick one another, strip their clothes, and the dancing restarts."

Track listing

Charts

Weekly charts

Year-end charts

Certifications

References

2019 songs
2019 singles
Diplo songs
Songs written by Diplo
Songs written by Missy Elliott
Songs written by Sting (musician)